Iasmin Latovlevici (born 11 May 1986) is a Romanian professional footballer who plays as a left-back.

Latovlevici started out as a senior at CFR Timișoara in 2005. He spent the best years of his career at Steaua București between 2010 and 2015, winning seven domestic honours during the period. He then went to appear for several teams in Turkey including Galatasaray, where he aided to the 2018–19 Süper Lig title, before returning to his native country in 2020.

Latovlevici made his debut for the Romania senior team in June 2011, in a 0–1 friendly loss to Brazil, and amassed 13 appearances for the nation.

Latovlevici won 6 championships in his career, 5 in Romania and 1 in Turkey.

Club career

Early career
After appearing in all matches in the first part of the 2005–06 season for CFR Timișoara, he was sold to neighbouring club Politehnica Timișoara and made his debut in the Divizia A in the same season, in a match against Oțelul Galați.

Steaua București
Latovlevici signed a five-year deal with Steaua București on 8 July 2010. He made his competitive debut on 25 July in a match against Universitatea Cluj.

On 21 February 2013, Latovlevici scored the opener against Ajax in the second leg of the UEFA Europa League round of 32, with his team managing to qualify further after winning 4–2 at the resulting penalty shootout.

Turkey
On 30 June 2015, Latovlevici agreed to a three-year contract with Turkish top-flight team Gençlerbirliği.

He then joined Kardemir Karabükspor during the 2016 summer transfer window.

On 7 September 2017, Galatasaray announced the transfer of Latovlevici for an undisclosed fee. He signed a one-year contract which would automatically be extended for another year if he makes 18 appearances for the club. He made his debut on 16 September in a 2–0 home win over Kasımpaşa.

International career
Latovlevici is a former Romania under-21 international player. He made his senior debut in June 2011 in a friendly against Brazil.

Career statistics

Club

International

Honours
Steaua București
Liga I: 2012–13, 2013–14, 2014–15
Cupa României: 2010–11, 2014–15
Supercupa României: 2013
Cupa Ligii: 2014–15

Galatasaray
Süper Lig: 2017–18

CFR Cluj
Liga I: 2020–21, 2021–22
Supercupa României: 2020

References

External links

1986 births
Living people
People from Moldova Nouă
Romanian people of Serbian descent
Romanian footballers
Association football defenders
Liga I players
Liga II players
FC CFR Timișoara players
FC Politehnica Timișoara players
ACF Gloria Bistrița players
FC Steaua București players
CFR Cluj players
FC Argeș Pitești players
Süper Lig players
Gençlerbirliği S.K. footballers
Kardemir Karabükspor footballers
Galatasaray S.K. footballers
Bursaspor footballers
Nemzeti Bajnokság I players
Kisvárda FC players
Romania under-21 international footballers
Romania international footballers
Romanian expatriate footballers
Expatriate footballers in Turkey
Romanian expatriate sportspeople in Turkey
Expatriate footballers in Hungary
Romanian expatriate sportspeople in Hungary